Robert Daniel Lowe (born 1985 in Wandsworth, London) is an English stage, television and film actor. Among his many theatre roles is that of 'Fleance' in Macbeth, and he has also been seen in a multitude of television programmes including a role in 12 episodes of The Bill as young offender Lee Dwyer as well as four episodes of Primeval as Jack Maitland. Doctors, Britain’s Boy Soldiers and Secret Smile and films such as Mrs Ratcliffe's Revolution and Shoot on Sight. He also appeared at 'Human Zoo' at the Courtyard Theatre, Hoxton.

He is the nephew of former Welsh 400 meter runner Jamie Baulch.

Filmography

Films

TV

References

External links

Robert Daniel Lowe on Spotlight

Living people
English male film actors
English male television actors
1985 births